Oeste is Portuguese and Spanish for west. The term may refer to:

Geography
 Õeste, a village in Leisi Parish, county of Saare, Estonia
 Oeste (intermunicipal community), Portugal, an administrative region and a NUTS III subregion

Other uses
 Oeste Futebol Clube, an association football team in the State of São Paulo, Brazil

See also 
 West (disambiguation)
 
 

de:Ouest
fr:Ouest (homonymie)
id:Barat
it:Ouest
lt:Vakarai
ms:Barat
nl:Ouest
pl:Zachód (ujednoznacznienie)
sk:Západ
zh:西